Chenta Laury is a visual artist and educator based on Maui, Hawai'i.

Early life and education 
Laury is originally from Oahu. She received an undergraduate degree in studio art and art history from Oberlin College, a Masters from Harvard University, and a Certificate in Applied Arts from the Fiber Crafts Studio in Chestnut Ridge, NY.

Career 
She has exhibited in shows throughout the country, including a large-scale installation at the Honolulu Biennial. Her work is held in numerous public and private collections, including the Four Seasons Hotels & Resorts and the Hawaii State Art Museum, and has been awarded prizes from numerous art institutions, including the Hawai'i Craftsmen's Statewide Exhibition.

Prior to moving home to Hawai'i in 2009, she worked at the Guggenheim Museum, and as head of education at the Noguchi Museum in New York City.

References

External links
 , official website

Harvard Graduate School of Education alumni
Oberlin College alumni
Living people
African-American artists
American artists
Interdisciplinary artists
21st-century African-American people
20th-century African-American people

Year of birth missing (living people)